Pinebluff is a town in Moore County, North Carolina, United States. The population was 1,337 at the 2010 census.

History
Pinebluff was once a regional resort area during the early 1900s, enjoying even greater renown than Pinehurst Resort at the time. After an uncontrollable fire, the town was permanently damaged, and is currently a small residential area. As of 1909, Pinebluff was a sundown town, where African Americans were not allowed to live or stay overnight. The Lincoln Park School and McLeod Family Rural Complex are listed on the National Register of Historic Places.

Geography
Pinebluff is located at  (35.106739, -79.470303). According to the United States Census Bureau, the town has a total area of 2.4 square miles (6.2 km), of which 2.4 square miles (6.2 km)  is land and 0.04 square mile (0.1 km)  (1.24%) is water.

Demographics

2020 census

As of the 2020 United States census, there were 1,473 people, 663 households, and 464 families residing in the town.

2000 census
As of the census of 2000, there were 1,109 people, 449 households, and 315 families residing in the town. The population density was 464.5 people per square mile (179.2/km). There were 481 housing units at an average density of 201.5 per square mile (77.7/km). The racial makeup of the town was 89.54% White, 7.39% African American, 0.72% Native American, 0.54% Asian, 0.72% from other races, and 1.08% from two or more races. Hispanic or Latino of any race were 1.17% of the population.

There were 449 households, out of which 33.0% had children under the age of 18 living with them, 56.6% were married couples living together, 11.1% had a female householder with no husband present, and 29.8% were non-families. 25.4% of all households were made up of individuals, and 7.8% had someone living alone who was 65 years of age or older. The average household size was 2.47 and the average family size was 2.97.

In the town, the population was spread out, with 25.2% under the age of 18, 6.4% from 18 to 24, 33.6% from 25 to 44, 24.8% from 45 to 64, and 10.0% who were 65 years of age or older. The median age was 35 years. For every 100 females, there were 90.9 males. For every 100 females age 18 and over, there were 90.4 males.

The median income for a household in the town was $40,536, and the median income for a family was $47,500. Males had a median income of $30,813 versus $24,167 for females. The per capita income for the town was $18,786. About 8.7% of families and 9.5% of the population were below the poverty line, including 14.9% of those under age 18 and 5.5% of those age 65 or over.

References

External links
 Moore County Chamber of Commerce

Sundown towns in North Carolina
Towns in Moore County, North Carolina
Towns in North Carolina